Typhoon Songda was the sixth most intense tropical cyclone of the Northwest Pacific Ocean in 2016. Also known as the Ides of October storm, it struck the Pacific Northwest region of the United States and Canada as a powerful extratropical cyclone. Songda was the twentieth named storm and the ninth typhoon of the annual typhoon season. The system developed into a tropical storm south of Minamitorishima on October 8 and strengthened into a typhoon on October 10. Songda reached its peak intensity southeast of Japan late on October 11 at an unusually high latitude, before it became extratropical on October 13.

Meteorological history

Over the next day as the system moved towards the northwest, showers and thunderstorms gradually developed along the trough, but were showing little to no signs of organisation. The system was subsequently classified as a tropical depression by the Japan Meteorological Agency during October 3, as it crossed the International Dateline and moved into the western Pacific Ocean.

Often presenting an exposed low-level circulation center (LLCC), the tropical depression drifted westward without further development for days owing to a marginal environment within the subsident region of a tropical upper tropospheric trough (TUTT) cell to the northwest, with moderate vertical wind shear. Late on October 7, the Joint Typhoon Warning Center (JTWC) eventually issued a Tropical Cyclone Formation Alert for the system, when the TUTT cell was beginning to move to the west-southwest, allowing convection to develop over the consolidating LLCC.

It was also upgraded to a tropical storm by the JTWC several hours later. The JMA upgraded Songda to a severe tropical storm late on October 9, when it was moving along the southwest periphery of the deep-layered subtropical ridge positioned to the northeast. Later, both of the JMA and JTWC reported that Songda had developed into a typhoon at 00:00 UTC on October 10. Turning northward, the typhoon rapidly intensified and formed a well-defined eye embedded in deep central convection, due to near radial outflow being limited on the southern portion, with a very strong poleward tap into the Westerlies, very low vertical wind shear, and sea surface temperature of 28 ºC. However, the eye became cloud-filled and ragged early on the next day, when Songda began to accelerate northeastward along the poleward side of the subtropical ridge.

Typhoon Songda reintensified in the afternoon on October 11. Moving in-phase with such strong southwesterly vertical wind shear effectively reduced its overall impacts to the system, allowing a rapid intensification again. Therefore, Songda developed a larger and sharp eye with a very symmetric core structure. With one-minute maximum sustained winds at  reported by the JTWC, equivalent to a Category 4 of the SSHWS, Songda was also an unusually northern super typhoon. Early on October 12, embedded deeper in the westerlies, the overall structure became more asymmetric with severe elongation and dispersion along the northern peripheries, leading the weakening trend and prompting the JTWC issuing the final warning to Songda, although the eye remained well-defined until the afternoon.

After the system weakened into a gale-force low and crossed the 180th meridian again in the afternoon, the National Weather Service (NWS) office in Portland dubbed it the Ides of October storm on the next day. On October 15, the system turned northeastward and underwent an explosive intensification.
Shortly after reaching hurricane-force, the extra-tropical cyclone weakened to storm-force and arrived at the coastline of Vancouver Island. The low continued to track northward and quickly became attached to a weakening stationary front, associated with a complex low-pressure system to the west, late on October 16; Songda's remnants were subsequently absorbed into the neighboring system.

Preparations and impact
Typhoon Songda stayed over open ocean as a typhoon and had little to no impacts while in the Western Pacific Ocean.

The extratropical remnant of Songda was the last in a line of three strong low-pressure systems to affect the western coast of Canada and the United States from October 12 through October 16. The storm was predicted to be the strongest and potentially most devastating of the three. In preparation of the low pressure's arrival the cities of Victoria and Vancouver closed public parks to prevent injuries from falling trees. The City of Vancouver added 150 additional homeless spaces while the City of Victoria opened up 325 emergency shelters. A number of ferries to Vancouver Island were also cancelled during the evening of October 15 in advance of the storm. Utility providers had requested assistance from interior Canada to provide quick support in case of power outages.

The winds were weaker than predicted because of the compact nature of the storm.

The storm left a large number of trees knocked over. This rendered some roads impassable and resulted in structural damage to homes, cars, and power lines. At the height of the event as many as 34,000 residents were left without power.

See also

Columbus Day Storm of 1962
Other storms of the same name
Pacific Northwest windstorm
Typhoon Nuri (2014)

References

External links

Pacific Analysis of Post-Tropical Cyclone Songda from the Ocean Prediction Center
JMA General Information of Typhoon Songda (1620) from Digital Typhoon

23W.SONGDA from the U.S. Naval Research Laboratory

2016 Pacific typhoon season
Pacific Northwest storms
October 2016 events in Asia
Hurricanes in Canada
October 2016 events in North America
Songda